Donna Mummau Rozar (née Mummau; born February 9, 1950) is an American politician, businesswoman, and nurse.  A Republican, she represents the 69th district of the Wisconsin State Assembly.  The 69th assembly district comprises most of the city of Marshfield, along with rural eastern Clark County, northwest Wood County, and southwest Marathon County.  She was elected in the 2020 general election.  Rozar is also a member of the Wood County Board of Supervisors, serving since 2000.

Early life and career 
Donna Rozar was born Donna Kay Mummau in Lancaster, Pennsylvania, and moved with her parents to Orange County, Virginia, where her father had purchased a farm.  She grew up on the farm and graduated from Orange County High School in 1968.  In 1971, she earned her nursing diploma from the Virginia Baptist Hospital School of Nursing, in Lynchburg, Virginia.  She then worked a year as an emergency room nurse at the University of Virginia Hospital in Charlottesville, where she earned her nurse practitioner certificate.  For the next five years, she worked as a nurse practitioner at Norfolk General Hospital, where she met her future husband, Dr. Ed Rozar.

She married Rozar in 1975 in Orange, Virginia, and moved with him to Knoxville, Tennessee.  There she attended the University of Tennessee and earned her bachelor's degree in nursing in 1981.  The couple moved frequently, living in Dallas, Texas, Pittsburgh, Pennsylvania, and Morgantown, West Virginia, over the next decade, adopting children along the way.  They finally moved to Marshfield, Wisconsin, in 1988, where Ed was diagnosed with HIV/AIDS in 1989.  Ed, a cardiothoracic surgeon, chose to retire from his practice to avoid accidentally exposing anyone else to the virus.

Following Ed's diagnosis, the Rozars appeared on The TODAY Show and Good Morning America to share their story; after Ed's death in 1993, Donna Rozar became a national speaker on AIDS awareness.

In the 1990s, she also owned and operated Town & Country Ventures LLC, through which she invested in and managed a number of commercial and residential properties.

Political career
Aside from AIDS awareness, Rozar became an outspoken supporter of pro-life causes, which led her into Republican Party politics in Wisconsin in the 1990s.

Rozar first ran for elected office in 1994, when she challenged 20-year incumbent Democratic state representative Donald W. Hasenohrl for his seat in the Wisconsin State Assembly.  Hasenohrl prevailed in the general election, but the margin—667 votes—was his closest contest since 1978.

Less than four months later, in February 1995, Rozar jumped into another campaign, running in the special election in the 24th state senate district to replace state senator David Helbach, who resigned unexpectedly at the beginning of the 1995–1996 session.  Again, Rozar was defeated, taking just 43% of the vote in the May 1995 special election.

In 1996, Rozar made another attempt at elected office, once again challenging state representative Donald Hasenohrl in the 70th assembly district.  In November, Rozar fell short again, this time winning just 39% of the vote.

After 1996, Rozar took a brief pause from seeking elected office, but remained active politically as an officer in the Republican Party of Wood County and as president of the Marshfield Woman's Club.  Additionally, Rozar served on state and local commissions by appointment.  Governor Tommy Thompson appointed her to the state Examining Board of Architects, Landscape Architects, Professional Geologists, Professional Engineers, Designers, and Land Surveyors in 1996; the Marshfield City Council appointed her to the local Cable Committee in 1997.  She also became associated with a local organization known as People Interested in Clean Air, which pressed the city of Marshfield for a ban on smoking in restaurants.

In April 2000, Rozar achieved her first elected office when she was elected to the Wood County Board of Supervisors, though she did not face an opponent in the race.  A month later, at the Republican congressional district caucuses, Rozar was elected as a delegate supporting George W. Bush for the 2000 Republican National Convention.  Rozar ran for a seat on the Marshfield Common Council in 2001, but fell 100 votes short of her opponent.

In 2003, the 24th senate district became vacant again when state senator Kevin Shibilski was appointed Secretary of Tourism in the newly inaugurated administration of Governor Jim Doyle.  Rozar again sought the seat, but was once again defeated, this time receiving less than 30% in the April special election.

Following her loss in 2003, Rozar returned to nursing full time in 2003, working as a cardiac medical-surgical nurse at St. Joseph's Hospital in Chippewa Falls, Wisconsin, and then at Marshfield Medical Center.  She also pursued her master's in nursing from Viterbo University, completing the degree program in 2008.  She served as an instructor at the Marshfield satellite campus of University of Wisconsin–Eau Claire, but retired in 2020.

In 2020, state representative Bob Kulp announced he would not seek another term in the Assembly in 2020.  In April 2020, after winning reelection to her 11th term on the Wood County Board, Rozar announced she would be a candidate for Wisconsin State Assembly in the 69th district.  She faced a crowded Republican primary field, but prevailed over her three opponents with 53% of the primary vote.  In the general election she faced Brian Giles, a truck driver and first-time candidate.  In November, she won 65% of the vote and, on her fifth attempt, was elected to the Wisconsin Legislature.

Personal life and family
Donna Kay Mummau took the last name Rozar when she married Dr. Ed Rozar in 1993.  Together they adopted five children who are now grown.  Ed was a medical doctor and contracted HIV from a patient sometime in the mid 1980s.  He died of AIDS-related complications in 1993.

Donna remarried in December 1997 to Michael J. Masanz, but the marriage was annulled five years later.

She is a member of the Wisconsin Nursing Association, the American Nursing Association, the American Nurses Credentialing Center, and the Sigma Theta Tau Honor Society of Nursing.

Electoral history

Wisconsin Assembly (1994)

| colspan="6" style="text-align:center;background-color: #e9e9e9;"| General Election, November 8, 1994

Wisconsin Senate (1995)

| colspan="6" style="text-align:center;background-color: #e9e9e9;"| Special Election, May 2, 1995

Wisconsin Assembly (1996)

| colspan="6" style="text-align:center;background-color: #e9e9e9;"| Republican Primary, September 10, 1996

| colspan="6" style="text-align:center;background-color: #e9e9e9;"| General Election, November 5, 1996

Marshfield Common Council (2001)

| colspan="6" style="text-align:center;background-color: #e9e9e9;"| General Election, April 3, 2001

Wisconsin Senate (2003)

| colspan="6" style="text-align:center;background-color: #e9e9e9;"| Special Election, April 29, 2003

Wisconsin Assembly (2020)

| colspan="6" style="text-align:center;background-color: #e9e9e9;"| Republican Primary, August 11, 2020

| colspan="6" style="text-align:center;background-color: #e9e9e9;"| General Election, November 3, 2020

References

External links

 
 Campaign website
 Wood County Board of Supervisors
 69th Assembly District (2011–2021)

Living people
1950 births
Politicians from Lancaster, Pennsylvania
People from Marshfield, Wisconsin
Women state legislators in Wisconsin
Republican Party members of the Wisconsin State Assembly
21st-century American politicians
21st-century American women politicians
University of Tennessee alumni
Viterbo University alumni
American women nurses